John Ralph Michell (August 12, 1861 – October 4, 1947) was a Canadian politician. He served in the Legislative Assembly of British Columbia from 1928 to 1933 from the electoral district of Kamloops, a member of the Conservative party. He also served as the mayor of Kamloops from 1903 to 1904.

References

1861 births
1947 deaths